The Bastiaan Quartet was a German string quartet from Berlin (1945-1970). It was named after the primarius Johannes Bastiaan. In 1955, the ensemble won 2nd prize at a competition in Liège. It was represented at festivals in Berlin and Helsinki. Concert tours have taken the quartet to the Netherlands, the United Kingdom, Switzerland, South Africa and Japan.

Members 
 1. Violin: Johannes Bastiaan (1945–1970)
 2. Violin: Hermann Bethmann (1945–1948) and Johannes Blau (1948–1970)
 Alto: Walter Müller (1945–1950), Fritz Steiner (1950–1963) and Giusto Cappone (1963–1970)
 Violoncello: Hans Bottermund (1945–1948), Werner Haupt (1948–1955) and Peter C. Steiner (1955–1970)

Recordings 
 Johann Strauss II, Rosen aus dem Süden and Schatz-Walzer, Audite/Deutschlandradio Kultur ?/2012
 Franz Schubert: Der Tod und das Mädchen (string quartet) and quartet movement in C minor, Eterna 1960

Further reading 
 Jürgen Stegmüller: Das Streichquartett. Eine internationale Dokumentation zur Geschichte der Streichquartett-Ensembles und Streichquartett-Kompositionen von den Anfängen bis zur Gegenwart. (Quellenkataloge zur Musikgeschichte. Vol. 40). Noetzel, Wilhelmshaven 2007, .

References

External links 
 
 on Discogs

German string quartets
Musical groups from Berlin
1945 establishments in Germany
1970 disestablishments in West Germany